The period spanning from 1916 to 1930 in Argentina is known as the Radical Phase, as it began with the election of the Radical Civic Union candidate Hipólito Yrigoyen, ending the conservative Generation of '80's domination on politics. Yrigoyen's second term, which started in 1928, was interrupted by Argentina's first military coup, which established José Félix Uriburu in power and initiated the Infamous Decade.

The First Yrigoyen Administration (1916–22) 

Conservative forces dominated Argentine politics until 1916, when their traditional rivals, the Radicals, led by Hipólito Yrigoyen, won control of the government through the first national elections made at universal male suffrage, due to the 1912 Sáenz Peña Law. 745,000 citizens were allowed to vote, on a total population of 7.5 million (immigrants, who constituted much of the population, were not allowed to vote), of which 400,000 abstained themselves. Yrigoyen, however, only obtained 45% of the votes, which did not allow him a majority in Parliament, where the conservatives remained the first force. Thus, on 80 draft laws proposed by the executive, only 26 were voted by the conservative majority. The moderate agricultural reform was refused by the Parliament, as well as a tax on interests and the creation of a Bank of the Republic (which was to have the missions of the current Central Bank).

Despite this conservative opposition, the Radical Civic Union (UCR), with their emphasis on fair elections and democratic institutions, opened their doors to Argentina's expanding middle class as well as to social groups previously excluded from power. Yrigoyen's policy was to "fix" the system, by enacting necessary reforms which would enable the agroindustrial export model to preserve itself. It altered moderate social reforms with repression of the social movements. A student movement started at the University of Córdoba, which eventually led to the University Reform of 1918, which quickly spread to the rest of America. In May '68, French students recalled the Córdoba movement.

Thus, on one hand, the Tragic Week of January 1919, during which the Argentine Regional Workers' Federation (FORA, founded in 1901) had called for a general strike after a police shooting, ended up in 700 killed and 4,000 injured. General Luis delle Piane marched on Buenos Aires to re-establish civil order. Despite being called for by some to initiate a coup against Yrigoyen, he remained loyal to the President, at the sole condition that the latter would allow him a free hand on the repression of the demonstrations. Social movements thereafter continued in the Forestal British company, and in Patagonia, where Hector Varela headed the military repression, assisted by the Argentine Patriotic League, killing 1,500.

On the other hand, Yrigoyen's administration enacted the Labor Code establishing the right to strike in 1921, implemented minimum wages laws and collective contracts. It also initiated the creation of the Dirección General de Yacimientos Petrolíferos Fiscales (YPF), the oil state company, in June 1922. Radicalism rejected class struggle and vouched for social conciliation.

World War I and Foreign Relations 

Meanwhile, the Radicals continued Argentina's neutrality policy during World War I, despite the United States' urge to push them into declaring war on the Triple Alliance. Neutrality enabled Argentina to export goods to Europe, in particular to Great Britain, as well as to issue credit to the belligerent powers. Germany sank two Argentine civilian ships, Monte Protegido on April 4, 1917 and the Toro, but the diplomatic incident ended only with the expulsion of the German ambassador, Karl von Luxburg. Yrigoyen organized a Conference of Neutral Powers in Buenos Aires, to oppose the United States' attempt to bring American states in the European war, and also supported Sandino's resistance in Nicaragua.

In September 1922, Yrigoyen's administration refused to follow the cordon sanitaire policy enacted against the Soviet Union, and, basing itself on the assistance given to Austria after the war, decided to send the USSR 5 million pesos in assistance.

The Alvear Administration (1922–28) 

The same year, Yrigoyen was replaced by his rival inside the UCR, Marcelo Torcuato de Alvear, an aristocrat, who defeated Norberto Piñero's Concentración Nacional (conservatives)  with 458,457 votes against 200,080. Alvear brought to his cabinet personalities belonging to the traditional ruling classes, such as José Nicolás Matienzo at the Interior Ministry, Ángel Gallardo at Foreign Relations, Agustín P. Justo at the War Ministry, Manuel Domecq García at the Marine and Rafael Herrera Vegas at the Haciendas. Alvera's supporters founded the Unión Cívica Radical Antipersonalista, opposed to Yrigoyen's party.

Alvear retroceded many of Yrigoyen's social reforms and labor laws, as well as the University Reform.

In 1922, the poet Leopoldo Lugones, who had turned towards fascism, made a famous speech in Lima, known as "the time of the sword", in presence of the War Minister and future dictator Agustín P. Justo, which called for a military coup and the establishment of a military dictatorship. The preceding year, the counter-revolutionary Logia General San Martín was founded, and diffused nationalist ideas in the military until its dissolving in 1926. Three years later, the misnamed Liga Republicana (Republican League) was founded by Roberto de Laferrere, on the model of Benito Mussolini's Black shirts in Italy. The Argentinian Right found its major influences in the 19th-century Spanish writer Marcelino Menéndez y Pelayo and in the French royalist Charles Maurras.

On the other hand, of the political spectrum, the Italian anarchist Severino Di Giovanni headed a propaganda of the deed campaign in support of Sacco and Vanzetti, as well as directing bombings against Fascist Italy's interests in Argentina. He was executed in 1931, after having perpetrated the most important bombing in Argentina, against the Italian consulate in May 1928.

Yrigoyen's return to power (1928–30) 

Yrigoyen was re-elected in 1928, and toppled by a military coup in 1930.

References

See also 
History of Argentina
Generation of '80
Infamous Decade
1924 Napalpí massacre

 
20th century in Argentina